Prunus fremontii is a North American species of plants in the rose family, known by the common name desert apricot. It takes its scientific name from John C. Frémont. It is found in northern and western Baja California especially, mostly Pacific and western, and the adjacent area of southern California. It also occurs in northern Baja California Sur.

Description 
The flowers are white or pink, blooming about the same time as the leaves unfurl in the spring. The fruits are yellow and egg-shaped.

Uses 
The fruits are an important food for Native American groups, such as the Cahuilla.

References

External links
Jepson Manual treatment for Prunus fremontii
Interactive Distribution Map of Prunus fremontii

fremontii
Flora of California
Trees of Baja California
Trees of Baja California Sur
Flora of the Sonoran Deserts
Natural history of the California chaparral and woodlands
Natural history of the Colorado Desert
Natural history of the Peninsular Ranges
Plants described in 1880
John C. Frémont
Taxa named by Sereno Watson
Plants used in Native American cuisine
Plants used in traditional Native American medicine
Trees of Mediterranean climate
Drought-tolerant trees
Drought-tolerant plants
Desert fruits